Kris is both a unisex given name and a surname.

Given name 
People with the name include:
 Kris Allen (born 1985), American musician and winner of season eight of American Idol
 Kris Aquino (born 1971), Filipino actress and host
 Kris Bernal (born 1989), Filipino actress
 Kris Boyd (born 1983), Scottish footballer
 Kris Boyd (American football) (born 1996), American football player
 Kris Bryant (born 1992), American baseball player
 Kris Clyburn (born 1996), American basketball player for Maccabi Rishon LeZion of the Israeli Basketball Premier League
 Kris Commons (born 1983), English-born Scottish footballer
 Kris Dunn (born 1994), American basketball player
 Kris Humphries (born 1985), American basketball player
 Kris Jenner (born 1955), American television personality
 Kris Johnson (baseball) (born 1984), American baseball player
 Kris Johnson (basketball) (born 1975), American basketball player
 Kris Jordan (1977-2023), American politician
 Kris Kristofferson (born 1936), American country music singer, songwriter and actor
 Kris Mangum (born 1973), American football player
 Kris Marshall (born 1973), English film and TV actor
 Kris Pister, American professor at University of California, Berkeley
 Kris Richard (born 1979), American football coach and former football player
 Kris Richard (basketball) (born 1989), US-born Romanian basketball player
 Kris Richard (racing driver) (born 1994), Swiss racing driver
 Kris Wilkes (born 1998), American basketball player
 Kris Wu (born 1990), Canadian-Chinese actor, singer-songwriter, and former member of boy band Exo

Surname 
 David S. Kris (born 1966), American lawyer
 Ernst Kris (1900–1957), American psychoanalyst and art historian

Fictional characters 
 Kris, the protagonist of the video game Deltarune
 Kris, default name for the player's avatar in Fire Emblem: New Mystery of the Emblem

See also
 Kristoff (disambiguation), whose meanings include a Scandinavian given name
 Krys, given name
 Chris, given name
 Crist (surname)

English unisex given names
Unisex given names
Hypocorisms